Sindhi cuisine (Sindhi: سنڌي کاڌا)  refers to the distinct native cuisine of the Sindhi people from Sindh, Pakistan. Sindhi cuisine has been influenced by Central Asian, Iranian, Mughal food traditions. It is mostly a non-vegetarian cuisine, with even Sindhi Hindus widely accepting of meat consumption. The daily food in most Sindhi households consists of wheat-based flat-bread (phulka) and rice accompanied by two dishes, one gravy and one dry with curd, papad or pickle. Freshwater fish and a wide variety of vegetables are usually used in Sindhi cuisine. Restaurants specializing in Sindhi cuisine are rare, although it is found at truck stops in rural areas of Sindh province, and in a few restaurants in urban Sindh.

Historical influences 
The arrival of Islam within India influenced the local cuisine to a great degree. Since Muslims are forbidden to eat pork or consume alcohol and the Halal dietary guidelines are strictly observed, Muslim Sindhis focus on ingredients such as beef, lamb, chicken, fish, vegetables and traditional fruit and dairy. Hindu Sindhi cuisine is almost identical with the difference that beef is omitted. The influence of Central Asian, South Asian and Middle Eastern cuisine in Sindhi food is ubiquitous. Sindhi cuisine was also found in India, where many Sindhi Hindus migrated following the Partition of India in 1947. Before Independence, the State of Sindh was under Bombay Presidency.

Food for special occasions
Certain dishes are served on special occasions such as Diwali a Bahji (vegetable dish) called Chiti-Kuni is made with seven vegetables. Special dishes are also served on recovery from serious illness for example when someone makes a full recovery from Chicken Pox, it is common to make an offering and make "mitho lolo", a sweet griddle-roasted flatbread: the dough is wheat flour mixed with oil (or ghee) and sugar syrup flavored with ground cardamom.
 Sai bhaji chawal, a popular dish from Sindh consists  of white steamed rice served with spinach curry which is given a 'tarka' with tomatoes, onions and garlic.

 Dal pakwan (mostly consumed by Sindhi hindus)

Koki is another popular Sindhi flat-bread that is prepared with wheat flour and goes well with any dal, sabzi or even curd or chai.
 Seviyan (Vermicelli), typically served as a sweetened (sometimes milk-based) dessert, is popular: Muslim Sindhis serve it on Bakra-Eid and Eid ul-Fitr. On special religious occasions, mitho lolo, accompanied with milk, is given to the poor.

 Sindhi Kadi is a unique and special dish prepared on festive occasions specially by Sindhis residing in India. It consists of a thick spicy gravy made from chick pea flour unlike buttermilk usually used for kadi preparation along with seasonal vegetables. It is served hot with rice.
 Mitho lolo is also served with chilled buttermilk called Matho on various occasions.
 A special sweet dish called 'Kheer Kharkun' are prepared and served on Eid ul-Fitr, it is prepared by mixing dates and milk, and slowly simmering the mixture for few hours. The dish is eaten hot in winters and cold in summers.
 Taryal Patata also called Took Aloo, a staple of Sindhi diet, is a form of thinly sliced, pan fried or deep fried potatoes with local spices. They are consumed in most rural households typically at dinner but can be consumed even for breakfast and lunch alongside other meals. One popular Sindhi way of having "patatas" is to eat it with plain white rice with daal to accompany it.

Pallo Machi is a popular Sindhi delicacy, is Hilsha fish prepared with numerous cooking methods. It can be deep fried and garnished with local spices, can be cooked with onions and potatoes into a traditional fish meal or barbequed. The fish often has roe, which is called "aani" in Sindhi and is enjoyed as a delicacy. Often fried alongside the palla and served with the fish fillets.
 Palli, is a saag or leafy green from the Chickpeas, and is enjoyed either cooked by itself like spinach or with fish cooked in the palli and called "Machi Palli". The saag has a unique flavor and is quite different from spinach or mustard saag and has a slightly sour and salty taste to it. It can take getting used to for the uninitiated.

Meals

Bhee (simply means 'lotus root' in English). A high quality lotus root is grown in the north of Sindh which is then cooked in clay-pot using various spices, which then results in an excellent delicacy that is famous all over Pakistan. Sindhi Briyani, Sindhi Curry, Sabu Dal Chawal (yellow daal with rice).

Drinks

 Thadal (famous Sindhi drink made from almonds and poppy seeds - khashkhaash).
 Khirni (hot drink made with milk, flavours of cardamoms and saffron).
 Sharbat (drink made from rose petals or sandal wood ).
 Falooda (vermicelli and ice on top of an ice cream)
 Lassi (dahi (yogurt)-based traditional drink)

Translations
This section provides the translations between Urdu/Hindi, Sindhi and English (British and American) cooking terms of common Sindhi food.

There are occasional differences in Sindhi dialects for instance Hyderabadi Sindhi will refer to an egg as 'bedo' however Sindhis from other parts will refer to it as 'ando'.

Herbs 

Spices

Fruit, Vegetable and Pulses

Nuts

Other

Vegetarian cuisine

Certain sects of the Sindhi community are vegetarians. The Thathai, Halai and Kutchi Bhatias are followers of Vallabh Acharya. He put forward a way to worship Sri Krishna called Pushtimarg. They are strict vegetarians who do not eat even onions and garlic and are devoted to Srinathji, the child form of Sri Krishna.

See also
 Indian cuisine
 Pakistani cuisine

References

External links 

 
Cuisine by ethnicity
Indian cuisine
Pakistani cuisine